Gliese 809 is a red dwarf star in the constellation Cepheus, forming the primary component of a multi-star system. A visual magnitude of 8.55 makes it too faint to see with the naked eye. It is part of the Gliese Catalogue of Nearby Stars and is located about 23 light-years (ly) from the Solar System. Gliese 809 has about 70.5% the radius of the Sun and 61.4% of the Sun's mass. It has a metallicity of −0.06, which means that the abundance of elements other than hydrogen and helium is just 87.1% that of the Sun.

This is a high proper motion star that moves about 0.77 arcseconds per year relative to background stars. In physical terms it is travelling with a space velocity of 31.1 km/s relative to the Solar System. The galactic orbit of this star carries it 21,300 ly from the Galactic Center at its perigee to 30,600 ly at its apogee. The orbital eccentricity is 17.8% with the semi-major axis of 25,956 ly and a semi-minor axis of 25,542 ly.

See also 
List of nearest stars and brown dwarfs

References

Cepheus (constellation)
High-proper-motion stars
M-type main-sequence stars
Durchmusterung objects
199305
103096
0809